Sergio Amedeo Pignari from the Politecnico di Milano, Milano, Italy was named Fellow of the Institute of Electrical and Electronics Engineers (IEEE) in 2012 for contributions to immunity characterization using bulk current injection test methods.

References

Fellow Members of the IEEE
Living people
Year of birth missing (living people)
Place of birth missing (living people)